Scotiptera is a genus of parasitic flies in the family Tachinidae.

Species
Scotiptera cyanea Giglio-Tos, 1893
Scotiptera gagatea (Robineau-Desvoidy, 1830)
Scotiptera pellucida (Robineau-Desvoidy, 1830)
Scotiptera robusta Curran, 1925
Scotiptera varipennis Wulp, 1891
Scotiptera venatoria (Fabricius, 1805)

References

Dexiinae
Diptera of North America
Diptera of South America
Tachinidae genera
Taxa named by Pierre-Justin-Marie Macquart